Finnlay Wyatt (born 18 January 1995) is an English footballer who plays for Gibraltar Second Division side Bruno's Magpies.

Career 

Wyatt signed with USL side Richmond Kickers on 25 February 2017. He made his professional debut on 25 March 2017 in a 1–0 victory over Harrisburg City Islanders. In summer 2018 he joined Bruno's Magpies in Gibraltar. He won his first piece of silverware with the club on 3 March 2019, scoring the winner in the 2018–19 Gibraltar Division 2 Cup final against Olympique 13.

Achievements
Bruno's Magpies
 Gibraltar Division 2 Cup: 2018–19

References 

1995 births
English footballers
F.C. Bruno's Magpies players
VCU Rams men's soccer players
Longwood Lancers men's soccer players
Richmond Kickers players
USL Championship players
Living people
English expatriate sportspeople in the United States
Expatriate soccer players in the United States
English expatriate footballers
Association football midfielders